Monroe Silver (December 21, 1875 – May 3, 1947) was an American actor and singer who was also a comedian and monologist using a Jewish dialect-accent in his performances.

Career
For various record labels, he recorded 78rpm discs of parodies like "Cohen on the Telephone" and "Cohen Phones to His Friend Levy". Joe Hayman first recorded the monologue "Cohen on the Telephone" in London in July 1913 for Regal Records and released in the U.S. by Columbia Records.

Lee De Forest recorded Silver doing "Cohen on the Telephone" for the DeForest Phonofilm sound-on-film process. The film premiered as Monroe Silver, Famed Monologist with 17 other Phonofilm short films at the Rivoli Theater in New York City on 15 April 1923. This film is now in the Maurice Zouary collection at the Library of Congress. From 1925 to 1935, Silver appeared on The Goodrich Silvertown Orchestra radio show.

With Silver's Jewish/Yiddish accent, words like "What are you doing?" came out as "Vot arrr you doink?" Some performers like Barney Bernard and Louis Mann tried to imitate him in the early 1920s, while Silver himself adapted the monologues of British vaudevillian Joe Hayman and others. Silver made many recordings with Billy Murray, as an Irish and Jewish dialect combo "Casey and Cohen". Their last recording together was on February 11, 1943, for Beacon Records.

See also
Jewish humor

References

Bibliography
 Corenthal, Michael G., Cohen on the Telephone: Jewish Humor and Dialect (Yesterday's Memories, 1984)
 Silver, Monroe, Monroe Silver's Famous "Cohen on the Telephone" and Over One Hundred Original Jokes, Stories, Etc. (New York: Irving Berlin, 1927)
 Whitburn, Joel, Joel Whitburn's Pop Memories 1890-1954: The History of American Popular Music (Menomonee Falls, Wisconsin: Record Research, Inc., 1986)

External links

 
 Cohen on the Telephone at SilentEra with picture of Silver from the film
 Billy Murray and Monroe Silver recordings at Internet Archive
 Billy Murray and Monroe Silver "Oh, How We Love Our Alma Mater" (1927) at Internet Archive
 List of Victor recordings of Silver at UC Santa Barbara archive
 List of Victor recordings with Silver as speaker
 Monroe Silver recordings at Internet Archive
 Silver at Library of Congress "National Jukebox"
 Discography of Monroe Silver at HonkingDuck (81 listings)

Vocalion Records artists
Vaudeville performers
1875 births
1947 deaths